Mordellistena tenuipalpis is a species of beetle in the genus Mordellistena of the family Mordellidae. It was described by Champion in 1891.

References

External links
Coleoptera. BugGuide.

Beetles described in 1891
tenuipalpis